Ewa Milewicz (born in 1948) is a Polish print journalist currently working for Gazeta Wyborcza.

Milewicz holds a degree in Law from the University of Warsaw. In 1980, she was active in the Gdansk Shipyards
as an organizer of the strike committee. She joined the Committee for Social Self-defence KOR in 1980.

References

1948 births
Living people
Members of the Committee for Social Self-Defense KOR
Polish journalists
Polish women journalists
Polish trade unionists
University of Warsaw alumni
20th-century Polish women